Aetanthus is a genus of flowering plants belonging to the family Loranthaceae.

Its native range is Venezuela to Peru.

Species:

Aetanthus andreanus 
Aetanthus colombianus 
Aetanthus coriaceus 
Aetanthus engelsii 
Aetanthus macranthus 
Aetanthus megaphyllus 
Aetanthus mutisii 
Aetanthus nodosus 
Aetanthus ornatus 
Aetanthus ovalis 
Aetanthus pascoensis 
Aetanthus prolongatus 
Aetanthus sessilifolius 
Aetanthus tachirensis 
Aetanthus trifolius 
Aetanthus validus

References

External links

Loranthaceae
Loranthaceae genera